Walter Watson Stokes (August 10, 1880 – March 27, 1960) was an American financier and politician from New York.

Life
He was born on August 10, 1880, in Manchester, Bennington County, Vermont, the son of financier Walter C. Stokes (1852–1924) and Adele (Watson) Stokes (1852–1921). In 1901, he became a member of the New York Stock Exchange. On May 14, 1902, he married Mary L. Constable (born 1884), and they had one son: Walter Watson Stokes Jr. (born 1903). They lived at 829 Park Avenue in Manhattan, and the Stokes family's country home "Woodside Hall" in Cooperstown. In 1931, Mary Stokes went to Reno, Nevada, to get a divorce.

Stokes was a member of the New York State Senate from 1933 to 1952, sitting in the 156th, 157th, 158th,  159th, 160th, 161st, 162nd, 163rd, 164th, 165th, 166th, 167th and 168th New York State Legislatures.

On November 14, 1934, he married Hannah Lee Sherman (1905–2001), a grand-niece of Gen. William Tecumseh Sherman. Hannah Sherman was a photo model, famous at the time as "Miss Chesterfield".

He died on March 27, 1960, in Bassett Hospital in Cooperstown, New York; and was buried at the Lakewood Cemetery there.

Sources

External links

 "Woodside Hall", his house in Cooperstown, at Flickr

1880 births
1960 deaths
Republican Party New York (state) state senators
People from Manchester, Vermont
People from Cooperstown, New York
People from the Upper East Side
American financiers
20th-century American politicians